A list of films produced in Brazil in 1960:

See also
1960 in Brazil

External links
Brazilian films of 1960 at the Internet Movie Database

Brazil
1960
Films